Shane Vasilică Cojocărel (born 20 March 1997) is an English-born Romanian professional footballer who plays for Northwood.

Career
Cojocarel signed a two-year scholarship with Barnet in 2013, and signed a one-year professional contract in the summer of 2015.

In 2015–16, Cojocarel had loan spells with Billericay Town and Northwood.

Cojocarel signed a new contract with the Bees at the end of the 2015–16 season. In 2015–16, he had loan spells with Metropolitan Police, a second spell at Billericay, and Merstham, before making his English Football League debut for the Bees as a substitute against Crawley Town on 11 March 2017. He joined Horsham on loan in March 2018. He was released by Barnet at the end of the 2017–18 season. He joined Maldon & Tiptree in August 2018, before joining Cheshunt in March 2019 and helping the club to promotion from the Isthmian League South Central division, scoring twice in the play-off final against Bracknell Town. Cojocarel joined FC Romania in October 2020. 

In February 2023 Shane rejoined former club Northwood FC

International career
Cojocarel was capped by Romania U-16 in 2013, coming on twice as a substitute in two games against Austria U-16 on 21 and 23 May.

Career statistics

References

External links

1997 births
Living people
English people of Romanian descent
English footballers
Romanian footballers
Romania youth international footballers
Association football midfielders
Queens Park Rangers F.C. players
Barnet F.C. players
Billericay Town F.C. players
Northwood F.C. players
Metropolitan Police F.C. players
Merstham F.C. players
Horsham F.C. players
Maldon & Tiptree F.C. players
Cheshunt F.C. players
F.C. Romania players
English Football League players
Isthmian League players
Southern Football League players
Footballers from the London Borough of Camden